The men's artistic gymnastics floor exercise competition at the 2015 European Games was held at the National Gymnastics Arena, Baku on 20 June 2015.

Qualification

The top six gymnasts with one per country advanced to the final.

Final

References 

Men's floor exercise